Edward Peter Jacobus (Ed) van den Heuvel (born 2 November 1940) is a Dutch astronomer and emeritus professor at the Astronomical Institute Anton Pannekoek of the University of Amsterdam.

Van den Heuvel is well known for his work on the formation and evolution of compact astrophysical objects such as neutron stars, black holes, and white dwarfs in binary systems, and for his investigation of gamma ray bursts.

Van den Heuvel studied mathematics, physics and astronomy at the Utrecht University. There, he obtained his PhD degree in 1968 for his research on the rotation of stars. During his career he held positions at (amongst others) the University of California, Utrecht University, Institute for Advanced Study, and the Vrije Universiteit Brussel.

For his work Van den Heuvel has been awarded with an Honorary Doctorate from the Katholieke Universiteit Leuven, the Spinozapremie (1995), the European Union Descartes Prize (2002) and the Viktor Ambartsumian International Science Prize of Armenia (2018). He has also been knighted in the Order of the Netherlands Lion. He is a member of the Royal Netherlands Academy of Arts and Sciences (since 1982), honorary fellow of the Indian Academy of Sciences, Associate of the Royal Astronomical Society and honorary fellow of the Inter University Center for Astronomy and Astrophysics (IUCAA), Pune, India.

References

External links 
 Website van Ed van den Heuvel
 Program symposium Wij Zijn Van Sterrenstof Gemaakt, 27 October 2005.

1940 births
Living people
20th-century Dutch astronomers
Members of the Royal Netherlands Academy of Arts and Sciences
People from Soest, Netherlands
Spinoza Prize winners
Academic staff of the University of Amsterdam
Utrecht University alumni